Cercosaura anordosquama is a species of lizard in the family Gymnophthalmidae. It is endemic to Brazil.

References

Cercosaura
Reptiles of Brazil
Endemic fauna of Brazil
Reptiles described in 2018
Taxa named by Marcelo José Sturaro
Taxa named by Miguel Trefaut Rodrigues
Taxa named by Guarino R. Colli
Taxa named by L. Lacey Knowles
Taxa named by Teresa C.S. Ávila-Pires